Palu is a city on the Indonesian island of Sulawesi.

Palu may also refer to:

Places
 Palù, Verona, Italy
 Palu, Elazığ, Turkey 
 Palu River, Sulawesi, Indonesia
 Piz Palü, a mountain in the Bernina Range, Switzerland
 Palü Glacier
 Palü Lake, a lake below Piz Palü
 Palu'e Island, or Palu Island, East Nusa Tenggara province, Indonesia
 Emirate of Palu, a Kurdish emirate from 1515 to c. 1839

People
 Boris Palu (born 1996), a French rugby player
 Louie Palu (born 1968), a Canadian photographer and filmmaker
 Tevita Silifou Palu (born 1981), a New Zealand rugby player
 Tomasi Palu (born 1986), a Tongan rugby player
 Uno Palu (born 1933), an Estonian decathlete
 Wycliff Palu (born 1982), known as Cliffy Palu, an Australian rugby player

Other uses
 Unified Lumumbist Party (French: Parti Lumumbiste Unifié, PALU), a political party in the Democratic Republic of the Congo
 Progressive Workers' and Farmers' Union (Dutch: Progressieve Arbeiders- en Landbouwersunie, PALU), a political party in Surinam
 Cape Lisburne LRRS Airport, Alaska, U.S., ICAO airport code PALU
 Manilkara hexandra, a tree species, known regionally as Palu
 Palu language, a spurious language

See also

 Palus (disambiguation)